The Peterborough Examiner is a newspaper that services Peterborough, Ontario and area. The paper started circulation in 1847, and is currently owned by Torstar and operated by its Metroland division. Between 1942 and 1955, it was edited by Canadian man of letters Robertson Davies, whose unique three-paragraph editorial style won several awards. Davies remained owner and publisher of the Examiner and Ralph Hancox the editor until 1967, when it was sold to the Thomson chain of newspapers. Subsequently, Sterling, Hollinger and Sun Media owned the newspaper before Postmedia. 

The Peterborough Examiner was one of several Postmedia newspapers purchased by Torstar in a transaction between the two companies which concluded on November 27, 2017. The paper continued to be published by the Metroland Media Group subsidiary of Torstar. In late May 2020, Torstar, accepted an offer for the sale of all of its assets to Nordstar Capital, a deal expected to close by year end. 

It is the only daily newspaper in Peterborough city and county. Its publisher is Neil Oliver and managing editor is Kennedy Gordon.

In the summer of 2020, in response to the COVID-19 pandemic in Ontario, the newspaper permanently closed its newsroom, with all staff working remotely.

See also
List of newspapers in Canada

References

External links
 
 Scans of Examiner issues ranging from 1858 to 1947 at the Internet Archive

Newspapers published in Peterborough, Ontario
Newspapers established in 1847
Torstar publications
Daily newspapers published in Ontario
1847 establishments in Ontario